Xaver Frick Jr. (born 4 March 1946) is a Liechtenstein middle-distance runner. He competed in the men's 800 metres at the 1968 Summer Olympics.

References

1946 births
Living people
Athletes (track and field) at the 1968 Summer Olympics
Liechtenstein male middle-distance runners
Olympic athletes of Liechtenstein
Place of birth missing (living people)